Oat Hills  may refer to:

 Oat Hills (Colusa County), California, USA
 Oat Hills (Mariposa County), California, USA
 Oat Hills (San Diego County), California, USA
 Oat Hills (Yuba County), California, USA